Bianca de Souza Mendes Comparato (born 19 November 1985) is a Brazilian actress and film director. She has starred in Como Esquecer in 2010, as well as A Menina sem Qualidades and Somos tão Jovens, both in 2013, the latter for which she won the Grande Prêmio do Cinema Brasileiro as Best Supporting Actress for her role of Carmem Teresa. In 2016, she starred in the Netflix series 3%, gaining international attention and acclaim for her portrayal of the series' character, Michele.

Early life 
Comparato was born in Rio de Janeiro, the daughter of the writer Doc Comparato and older sister of actress and presenter Lorena Comparato. She is of Portuguese and Italian descent. At age 16, Comparato attended a three-month course at the Royal Academy of Dramatic Arts in London, as a prize given by the British School of Rio de Janeiro, for standing out in the theatre course. She returned to Brazil determined to quit school to devote herself to her artistic career, but was dissuaded by her parents. Along with the regular school, Comparato attended courses on body language and drama. In 2010 she graduated from the film school at the Pontifical Catholic University of Rio de Janeiro.

Career 
Comparato's first theatrical performance was in O Ateneu, directed by Leonardo Bricio. She debuted on television in 2004, participating in the series Carga Pesada. Later that year, she made a cameo appearance in Senhora do Destino.

In 2005, she played Maria João in Belíssima, a girl who lived through war with her sister Giovanna, played by Paolla Oliveira. She then made an appearance in Cobras & Lagartos in 2006. The same year she starred in the short film Pedro, Ana e a Verdade, appeared in the film Anjos do Sol  and posed for the "Women We Love" feature in Playboy Brazil.

In 2007, Comparato appeared in the series Toma Lá, Dá Cá and Antônia, based on the film of the same name, the miniseries Amazônia, de Galvez a Chico Mendes, and the play Últimos Remorsos Antes do Esquecimento. In 2008, she joined the Beleza Pura cast of TV Globo and also premiered the play A Fruta e a Casca, inspired by the story of Dom Casmurro.

The following year in 2009, she performed the play Rock'n'Roll and the cast of the television series Aline from the first season onwards, in which she, as Kelly, lived with her modern best friend Aline.

In 2010, Comparato was in the feature film starring Como Esquecer How Ana Paula Arósio. In the same year, she acted in the play Mordendo os Lábios, written and directed by Hamilton Vaz Pereira. In 2011, she participated in two episodes of Tapas & Beijos, enacts the stage show A Escola do Escândalo and also made a cameo on the soap opera A Vida da Gente.

In 2012 she participated in the episode "A Culpada de BH" in the series As Brasileiras, will be on the soap opera Avenida Brasil of João Emanuel Carneiro, in the novel she interprets the attendant Betânia.

In 2013, Comparato appeared in Somos tão Jovens, a biographical work on the singer Renato Russo. She won the Grande Prêmio do Cinema Brasileiro Best Supporting Actress award for her performancee. In the same year she returned to television with the series A Menina Sem Qualidades, MTV Brasil's first foray in the field of television drama. She was also in Season 2 of the series Sessão de Terapia.

Personal life
As of January 2020, Comparato had been dating actress Alice Braga for three years.

Filmography

References

External links 
 Official website 
 

1985 births
Living people
LGBT actresses
Brazilian LGBT actors
Actresses from Rio de Janeiro (city)
Brazilian people of Portuguese descent
Brazilian people of Italian descent
Brazilian television actresses
Brazilian film actresses
Brazilian stage actresses
Alumni of RADA
Pontifical Catholic University of Rio de Janeiro alumni
21st-century Brazilian actresses
21st-century Brazilian LGBT people